Jerome Murphy-O'Connor  (born 10 April 1935, Cork City,  Ireland – died 11 November 2013, Jerusalem) was a Dominican priest, a leading authority on St. Paul, and a Professor of New Testament at the École Biblique in Jerusalem, a position that he held from 1967 until his death.

Biography
He was born James Murphy-O'Connor in 1935 to Kerry and Mary (née McCrohan) Murphy-O'Connor, the eldest of four siblings. A cousin is Cardinal Cormac Murphy-O'Connor, the 10th Archbishop of Westminster. 

Murphy-O'Connor attended the Christian Brothers College, Cork, and later the Vincentian Castleknock College in Dublin, where he decided to become a Dominican priest. He entered the Dominican novitiate in Cork in September 1953, giving up his baptismal to take a new name in religion, "Jerome". After the novitiate he studied philosophy for a year before studying at The Priory Institute in Tallaght and at the University of Fribourg in Switzerland. He was ordained  as a priest in July 1960. In Fribourg his first serious study as a lecturer was on the theme of preaching in Saint Paul, which was later developed into a doctoral thesis. He received his doctorate in 1962.

École Biblique
In 1963 he studied in Rome, and researched the Dead Sea Scrolls at the University of Heidelberg, and New Testament theology at the University of Tübingen. From there he went to Jerusalem to the École Biblique, which was to become his religious, scholarly, and personal home. The École Biblique, founded in 1890 by French Dominican scholars, is an internationally renowned centre for Biblical studies and Biblical archaeology. He remained there for the rest of his life, having been appointed Professor of New Testament in 1967. He received honorary degrees in the US and Australia, and particularly treasured the doctorate of literature conferred in 2002 by the National University of Ireland in University College Cork.

Oxford University Press invited him to write an archaeological guide to the Holy Land which was first published in 1980. This was translated into several languages, with a fifth edition in 2008, and it has become the standard guide book. Murphy-O'Connor lectured around the world; he also made numerous television appearances, including in Le Mystère Paul (2000), Jesus: The Complete Story (2001), The Search for John the Baptist (2005), Christianity: A History for Channel 4 (2009), and "David Suchet: In the Footsteps of St Paul (TV documentary, 2012)". 

He was also interviewed for the docudrama The Lost Tomb of Jesus, although he later stated that he was misquoted and misrepresented by the filmmakers, stressing that he did not believe there was any truth in the movie's claims, which he dismissed as "a commercial ploy".

Views

On Paul 
Murphy-O'Connor was considered a leading scholar on Paul the Apostle, on whom he authored several major works, both for scholarly and lay audience. In them, he tried to reconstruct the life and theology of the Apostles, mainly relying on his epistles, while avoiding the use of the Acts of the Apostles, unless necessary; he also consistently defended the authenticity of the Second Epistle to the Thessalonians, the Epistle to the Colossians and the Second Epistle to Timothy.

Selected works
Murphy-O'Connor authored many research articles and reviews, often in Revue Biblique. In addition, he authored or co-authored the books listed below.

References

Further reading
"Father Jerome Murphy-O'Connor - Obituary", The Daily Telegraph, 15 November 2013
" Fr Jerome Murphy-O’Connor: Why scholarship trumps archaeology", Catholic Herald, 13 November 2013 
Obituary of Jerome Murphy-O’Connor – Catholic Biblical Association
"Jerome Murphy-O'Connor, O.P.: A Life Well Lived", America, 19 November 2013

External links
Murphy-O'Connor interview – Australian Broadcasting Corporation, 13 April 2005

1935 births
2013 deaths
Irish Dominicans
Irish biblical scholars
Roman Catholic biblical scholars
New Testament scholars
20th-century Irish Roman Catholic priests
Irish scholars and academics
People educated at Castleknock College
University of Freiburg alumni
Academic staff of École Biblique